Charles H. Robbins (born 1965/1966) is an American businessman, and the chairman and chief executive officer (CEO) of Cisco Systems.

Early life
Robbins was born in Grayson, Georgia, and educated at Rocky Mount High School in Rocky Mount, North Carolina. He earned a Bachelor of Mathematics degree, in 1987, from the University of North Carolina at Chapel Hill.

Career
Robbins began his career as an application developer for North Carolina National Bank, (now part of Bank of America). After five years, he then joined Wellfleet Communications, which merged with SynOptics to become Bay Networks, followed by a brief tenure at Ascend Communications, before joining Cisco, in 1997.

At Cisco, Robbins filled various posts, including senior vice president of the Americas and senior vice president of Worldwide Field Operations, a role in which he led Cisco's Worldwide Sales and Partner Organizations, and built out Cisco's partnership program.

In May 2015, Cisco announced that the CEO and chairman John Chambers would step down as CEO in July 2015, while remaining as chairman. Robbins, then a senior vice president, was named as his successor. Mentored by Chambers;
 Robbins was unanimously voted in as the company's new chief executive, becoming CEO of Cisco Systems in July 2015.

As CEO, Robbins became noted for accelerating the pace of Cisco's modern growth, while disrupting outdated working modes; promoting employee trust based in transparency of policy and process; and humanitarian policies and workplace diversity.

In 2018, as the GDPR came into effect, Robbins called for more regulation and for the tech industry to help educate regulators. In February 2019, Robbins promoted the need for comprehensive global privacy legislation, asserting privacy as “a fundamental human right."

Robbins advocated against a 15% increase on tariffs for Chinese goods. Robbins has advocated for corporate social responsibility. In March 2018, Cisco pledged to donate $50M to Destination: Home, an organization devoted to ending homelessness in Santa Clara County, where Cisco's headquarters is located; Robbins serves as honorary counsel to the NPO.

Boards and affiliations
Robbins serves the World Economic Forum as the chair for the IT Governors Steering Committee and as a member of the International Business Council. He is a member of the Ford Foundation board of trustees. He is a director for BlackRock, and for the Business Roundtable, where he chairs the Immigration Committee.

In 2018, Robbins authored a statement on behalf of Business Roundtable that applauded bipartisan lawmakers working to reform immigration policies, while urging the White House “Administration to end immediately the policy of separating accompanied minors from their parents,” decrying the practice as “cruel and contrary to American values.”

Robbins spoke at the World Economic Forum in Davos, Switzerland in 2016, 2017, and 2018, and at the 2019 WEF annual general meeting.

He has been a board member of the MS Society of Northern California; a member of the Advisory Board of Georgia Tech; and a member of the International Council for the Belfer Center for Science and International Affairs at Harvard University. He is also a member of the 2019 class of the American Academy of Arts and Sciences.

Personal life
Robbins is a fan of North Carolina Tar Heels men's basketball; participates in social media, and is noted for his humor. He is married with four children and lives in Los Gatos, California.

References

External links
 "Behind the scenes at Cisco with CEO Chuck Robbins and his team" (video) Cisco; April 2, 2019. Accessed June 28, 2109.

Living people
University of North Carolina at Chapel Hill alumni
American chief executives of manufacturing companies
American technology chief executives
Cisco people
1960s births
People from Los Gatos, California
People from Gwinnett County, Georgia